Jean-Pierre (Jempi) Kemmer (8 December 1923 – 21 December 1991) was a Luxembourg composer and conductor.

A percussionist, pianist, and choir master, he was a member of the RTL Symphony Orchestra. He composed choir works, symphonies, operettas, film music and concertos. In 1969, he founded the Choeurs de Jean-Pierre Kemmer.

Compositions
"Promendade à Grunewald" (1953)
"Dimanche matin à Luxembourg" (1954)
"Concerto pour trompette et orchestre" (1960)
"Symphonie des morts" (1963)
"Le chant des saisons" (1966)
"Messe de jazz" (1975)
"The Funny Horn" (1976)
"Passio secundum Iohannem" (1976)

He also composed the music for three operettas:
An enger Summernuecht
D'Vakanz am Mëllerdall
Ënner bloem Himmel

Many of his compositions are available on the following set of four CDs:
"Jean-Pierre Kemmer - Komponist, Dirigent a Pianist 1923-1991", ''Centre National de l'Audiovisuel (CNA), Luxembourg, 2004.

References

1923 births
1991 deaths
20th-century composers
20th-century pianists
Luxembourgian composers
Luxembourgian pianists